The 2022 Portland State Vikings football team represented Portland State University as a member of the Big Sky Conference during the 2022 NCAA Division I FCS football season. Led by sixth-year head coach Bruce Barnum, the Vikings played their home games off campus at Hillsboro Stadium in Hillsboro, Oregon, a suburb west of Portland.

Previous season

The Lumberjacks finished the 2021 season 5–6 overall, 4–4 in Big Sky play to finish in a tie for seventh place.

Preseason

Polls
On July 25, 2022, during the virtual Big Sky Kickoff, the Vikings were predicted to finish in the Big Sky ninth by the coaches and eighth by the media.

Preseason All–Big Sky team
The Vikings had three players selected to the preseason all-Big Sky team.

Offense

Beau Kelly – WR

Defense

Anthony Adams – S

VJ Malo – DT

Schedule

Game summaries

at San Jose State

at Washington

at No. 2 Montana

Northern Arizona

Lincoln (CA)

No. 6 Weber State

at No. 17 Idaho

at Eastern Washington

Northern Colorado

No. 2 Sacramento State

at Cal Poly

References

Portland
Portland State Vikings football seasons
2022 in sports in Oregon
2022 in Portland, Oregon
Sports in Hillsboro, Oregon